ISOD may refer to:

 International Sports Federation of the Disabled, former name of the International Wheelchair and Amputee Sports Federation
 Intelligence Special Operations Division, a former division of the National Bureau of Investigation, Philippines
 Insulated shutter opening device, a plastic pin on a UK electrical plug

See also
 Izod, a clothing manufacturer